The Eighth Federal Electoral District of Chiapas (VIII Distrito Electoral Federal de Chiapas) is one of the 300 Electoral Districts into which Mexico is divided for the purpose of elections to the federal Chamber of Deputies and one of 12 such districts in the state of Chiapas.

It elects one deputy to the lower house of Congress for each three-year legislative period, by means of the first past the post system.

District territory
The Eighth District of Chiapas covers eight municipalities near the Guatemalan border: Bella Vista, Chicomuselo, Comitán de Domínguez, Frontera Comalapa, La Independencia, La Trinitaria, Socoltenango and Tzimol.

The district's head town (cabecera distrital), where results from individual polling stations are gathered together and collated, is the city of Comitán.

Previous districting schemes

1996–2005 district
Between 1996 and 2005, the Eighth  District had a slightly different configuration. Still in the same broad region and centred on Comitán, it covered the following municipalities:
Comitán de Domínguez, La Independencia, La Trinitaria, Socoltenango and Tzimol, as at present, plus:
Amatenango del Valle, Chanal, Las Rosas, and Teopisca.

The Eighth District of Chiapas was created in 1977. Prior to that year, Chiapas only had six federal electoral districts. The Eighth District elected its first deputy, to the 51st Congress, in 1979.

Deputies returned to Congress from this district

LI Legislature
1979: Juan Sabines Gutiérrez (PRI)
1979–1982: Alberto Cuesy Balboa (PRI)
LII Legislature
1982–1985:
LIII Legislature
1985–1988:
LIV Legislature
1988–1991: Leyber Martínez González (PRI)
LV Legislature
1991–1994:
LVI Legislature
1994–1997: Germán Jiménez Gómez (PRI)
LVII Legislature
1997–2000: Juan Carlos Gómez Aranda (PRI)
LVIII Legislature
2000–2003: Roberto Javier Fuentes Domínguez (PRI)
LIX Legislature
2003–2006: Mario Culebro Velasco (PRI)
LX Legislature
2006–2009: Arnulfo Cordero Alfonzo (PRI)

References and notes 

Federal electoral districts of Mexico
Government of Chiapas